The 1993 Indonesian Grand Prix was a Formula Brabham race held on August 21–22, 1993 at the Sentul International Circuit near Citeureup, Indonesia. It was the first round of a two event Pan-Pacific series for the Australian-based Formula Brabham category.

Summary
The 1993 was the first race held at the newly constructed state-owned Sentul International Circuit, built in an attempt to secure a Formula One Grand Prix from 1994 onwards. With no local form of open wheel motor racing occurring in Indonesia (as it had been several years since a motor racing circuit had operated in the country), organisers looked into importing a field of racing. After investigating the potential costs of importing the European Formula 3000 Championship and several Formula 3 series, the geographically closer Australian Formula Brabham series was selected.

To increase local interest, a selection of Indonesian drivers were brought in to fill the field. These were led by Tommy Suharto, son of incumbent Indonesian president Suharto, but also included Tinton Soeprapto (father of Ananda Mikola and Moreno Soeprapto) and leading Indonesian driving instructor . For Suharto's protection, a 300m long pane of bulletproof glass was installed around the main grandstand and Indonesian military were stationed in the surrounding mountainside.

1989 Driver to Europe champion Mark Larkham qualified on pole for the two-legged affair ahead of Paul Stokell and reigning CAMS Gold Star winner Mark Skaife. The leading local entrant was Bahar in 12th. Rival competitors were forced into signing a waiver allowing Suharto to compete with a Mugen-Honda V8 Formula 3000 engine in his car (compared to the regular Holden V6) but in the interests of fairness he was required to start from the back of the grid. Larkham went on to win both races as Suharto crashed at the first corner of the first heat in his overpowered Reynard. Stokell trailed home Larkham in each heat, followed by Graham Watson in Heat 1 and Skaife in Heat 2. Bahar remained the best local with a fourth-placed finish in the opening race.

Classification

Qualifying

 Tommy Soeharto, the youngest son of then Indonesian president Suharto, qualified 17th but engine problems forced the team to replace the V6 Holden engine with a V8 Mugen-Honda Formula 3000 engine and only started with the approval of the other competitors.

Race 1

Race 2

Points

References 

 
 

Indonesian Grand Prix
Grand Prix
Indonesian Grand Prix
Formula Holden
Grand Prix race reports
August 1993 sports events in Asia